Pakistan–Taiwan relations mainly involve commerce and trade. The relationship between Pakistan and Taiwan is more likely to be of economic significance rather than political, as Pakistan is a close ally of China.

History
Pakistan and Taiwan have had a very weak relationship since 1951. When Pakistan became independent, it maintained a relationship with Taiwan from 1947 to 1951, until China emerged on the global map following the Second Chinese Civil War, Pakistan took the side of China instead of Taiwan.

Economic ties
Pakistan and Taiwan do not maintain any official embassy council, trade or cultural center, but nevertheless, they are progressively carrying on trading. In 2019, Taiwan showed interest in relocating their textile industry from Vietnam to Pakistan, owing to cheap labour costs in Pakistan.

Trade volume
The major imports between Pakistan and Taiwan include petroleum products, electrical machinery, plastics, iron, and steel. According to Taiwan External Trade Development Council (TAITRA) data, Pakistan’s imports from Taiwan totalled US$626 million in 2019. In the same year, its exports to Taiwan were worth US$ 100 million,

Ambassador ties
While Taiwan opened an embassy in Pakistan after 1951, Pakistan did reciprocate this in Taiwan. However Pakistan later opened General Council in Hong Kong, whose jurisdiction spreads across Hong Kong, Macau, and Taiwan. Pakistan comes under the jurisdiction of Taiwan’s Taipei Economic and Cultural Representative Office in the Kingdom of Saudi Arabia.

References

Taiwan
Bilateral relations of Taiwan